Fähnrich is an officer candidate rank in the Austrian Bundesheer and German Bundeswehr.  The word  comes from an older German military title,  (flag bearer), and first became a distinct military rank in Germany on 1 January 1899.  However,  ranks are often incorrectly compared with the rank of ensign, which shares a similar etymology but is a full-fledged (albeit junior) commissioned officer rank.

In the German Landsknecht armies, recorded from ca. 1480, the equivalent rank of a Cornet existed. The cornet carried the troop standard, also known as a "cornet".

The rank also exists in a few other European military organizations, often with historical ties to the German system. Examples are the Netherlands, Denmark, Sweden, Norway, and Finland (see Fänrik). The French Army has a similar position called an Aspirant.

In the Finnish landforces and airforce,  is the lowest commissioned officer rank, which is granted to the soldiers in the national service on the day they are released from their 347-day service. Finnish  are thus of equal rank to the German lieutenant (also a platoon leader).

Austria

Austrian Bundesheer 

, short , is the lowest commissioned officer rank in the Austrian Armed Forces.

Austria-Hungaria (until 1918) 

 was the lowest officer rank in the k.u.k. Common Army. In 1908  was re-introduced as lowest cadet-officer rank in order to replace the 1869 rank designation . ,  respectively completed training and education on the less famous so-called k.u.k. .

In the k.u. Royal Hungarian Honvéd army  was the equivalent to the  rank. It accounted immediately to the officer corps.

Denmark

Finland

Germany

Bundeswehr 

In the German Bundeswehr, an officer candidate can reach the rank of  after 21 months of service. The German Navy equivalent is "Ensign at sea".

An officer candidate's career is indicated by the enlisted rank with a thin silver cord on the shoulder strap.

History

Imperial German Army

National People's Army 

Following the creation of the National People's Army, a  rank group was created.

Netherlands

Norway

Sweden

See also
 Fähnrich zur See

References 

Sources
 

Military ranks of Austria
Military ranks of Germany